Tama Theis (born February 9, 1960) is a Minnesota politician and member of the Minnesota House of Representatives. A member of the Republican Party of Minnesota, she represents District 14A in central Minnesota.

Education
Theis attended St. Cloud Technical and Community College, graduating with an A.A.S.

Minnesota House of Representatives
Theis was elected to the Minnesota House of Representatives in a special election in 2013.

Opposition to COVID vaccine mandates
In December 2021, Theis joined 37 other Republican members of the Minnesota House in signing a letter to the Mayo Clinic challenging its policy requiring staff to be vaccinated against COVID-19. The letter said in part, "We will not support state funding for programs like these, or any other funding, for any healthcare facility that fires their employees due to unrealistic vaccine mandate policies."

Personal life
Theis is married to Greg Theis. They have two children and reside in St. Cloud, Minnesota.

References

External links

Official House of Representatives website
Official campaign website

1960 births
Living people
Politicians from St. Cloud, Minnesota
Women state legislators in Minnesota
Republican Party members of the Minnesota House of Representatives
21st-century American politicians
21st-century American women politicians